Tanling ruqun, also known as Tan collar ruqun and U-collar ruqun, is a type of Hanfu which was developed under the influence of Hufu (most likely influenced by Qiuci); it is a form a kind of ruqun which typically consists of three parts, featuring a low-cut low-cut U-shaped collar upper inner garment with long sleeves, a U-shaped collar banbi upper outer garment with short sleeves, a long high-waisted skirt. It can also be adorned with a shawl, called pipo. It was a popular form of clothing attire in the Sui and Tang dynasty. In the 21st century, the Tanling ruqun re-appeared as a result of the Hanfu movement. The 21st century Tanling ruqun was developed by reproducing the original patterns of the historical tanling ruqun while being aligned with modern aesthetics.

Terminology 

The term tanling ruqun is composed of the terms tanling and ruqun. Tanling refers to the U-shaped collar of the upper garment, typically specifically referring to the U-shaped banbi which is worn as an outer upper garment. The term ruqun refers to the traditional two piece attire of the ancient Han Chinese consisting of a skirt and an upper garment called ru.

Construction and design 
The tanling ruqun is mainly composed three parts: a long wrap skirt, a U-shaped collar inner shirt with long sleeves, and a tanling banbi (a U-shaped short sleeves outer jacket). 

Unearthed artefacts dating in the Tang dynasty, such as sculptures and paintings show that the long-sleeves, low-cut inner shirt could be tucked under the long (high-waisted) skirts.The skirts could be embellished with stripe patterns of two colours or be found in monochrome colours. The banbi falls above the waistor were waist-length, and they could be embellished with embroidered borders at the wrist. The banbi could also be tucked under or worn over the long skirt. The tanling ruqun can also be worn together with a shawl, called pipo, around the arms or the shoulders of its wearer; they could also wear it together with variety of hats.In the Tang dynasty, hats of foreign origins or influence, such as the mili, weimao and humao, were worn when horseback riding.

History 

The late sixth century, for example in the Sui dynasty, was marked the arrival of new style of women's Hanfu. The new style of clothing had high waisted skirt almost similar to the Empire silhouette and the upper garments had low décolletage. The Sui dynasty women already liked wearing banbi over their long-sleeved clothing. Tanling garments, including the tanling banbi, was already popular in the court of the early Sui dynasty, the predecessor of the Tang dynasty. The Tang dynasty continued the clothing style of its predecessor, and women continued to wear high-waisted skirt, low-cut upper garments and long skirts.

In the early Tang dynasty up to the late 8th century, banbi were also popular among women, including noble and common women. According to the New Book of Tang, "banbi, skirt, and ru are common clothes for maids served at the Eastern Palace". In the 7th century, palace women could wear banbi over a plain shirt and a high-waisted, A-line skirts which could be monochrome or striped. In the Tang dynasty, new styles of Tanling banbi appeared and became extremely popular. Some shapes of banbi (such as the tanling banbi) worn in the early Tang appears to have been mainly influenced by the banbi worn in Qiuci. Figures wearing banbi and striped skirt holding a shawl (pipo) and wearing low cut upper garments appear on the murals of Kizil Grottoes in Xinjiang; the shape and matching garments customs were similar to the early Tang dynasty's women clothing attire. In the first decade of the 8th century, skirts in monochrome colours became more popular than stripped skirts. By the mid-Tang dynasty around the mid-8th century, upper garments with low décolletage lost popularity and women started to cover themselves with shawl; there were also new ideals of beauty favouring extremely plum and voluptuous women over the youthful slenderness of the Sui and the early Tang dynasties.

Other types of ruqun 

 Mianfu
 Qixiong ruqun
 Qungua (裙褂): a type of ruqun worn as a Traditional Chinese Wedding dress in Qing and in modern era.
 Xiuhefu (秀禾服): a type of aoqun worn as a Traditional Chinese Wedding dress in Qing and in modern era.
 Xuanduan (玄端): a very formal dark  with accessories; equivalent to the Western white tie.

See also 

 Han Chinese clothing
 List of Han Chinese clothing
 Ru - Chinese upper garment, also known as ao and shan
 Chang'ao - a long-version of the Chinese upper garment ao
 Banbi

References 

Chinese traditional clothing